HGR may refer to:
 Hagerstown Regional Airport, in Maryland, US
 Hither Green railway station,  London, England